Bandar Abbas International Airport  is an international airport located in 12 kilometers east of the city of Bandar Abbas, Hormozgan Province, in southern Iran. The airport has flight connections to  different parts of Iran and countries of south of Persian Gulf, and about 1,289,000 passengers passed through it in 2017. This airport is able to handle widebody aircraft such as Boeing 777 or Boeing 747.

Airlines and destinations

Incidents
 Iran Air Flight 655 was shot down after departing from Bandar Abbas in 1988. 
 IRIAF F-4 Phantom II crashed near Bandar Abbas on October 14, 2012, killing two airmen.

Gallery

See also
Iran Civil Aviation Organization
Transport in Iran
List of airports in Iran
List of the busiest airports in Iran
List of airlines of Iran
Bandar Abbas
Iran

References

External links
 
 

Airports in Iran
Transportation in Hormozgan Province
Buildings and structures in Hormozgan Province